This is a list consisting of current and former broadcasts by the Indian television channel Zee TV.

Currently broadcasts

Formerly broadcasts

Acquired series

Anthology series

Children/teen series

Comedy series

Drama series

Supernatural series
{|class="wikitable sortable"
|-
!Year
!Show
!Notes
|-
|2019
|Aghori
|
|-
|2016–2021
|Brahmarakshas
|
|-
|2012–2019
|Fear Files: Darr Ki Sacchi Tasvirein|
|-
|2019–2020
|Haiwaan|
|-
|2014–2015
|Maharakshak: Aryan|
|-
|2015
|Maharakshak: Devi|
|-
|2018–2020
|Manmohini|
|-
|1995
|Mano Ya Na Mano|
|-
|2007–2009
|Naaginn|
|-
|2001
|Pradhan Mantri 
|
|-
|2004–2005
|Rooh|
|-
|2008–2009
|Shree|
|-
|2016
|Vishkanya Ek Anokhi Prem Kahani|
|-
|1998
|Woh|
|-
|1993–2001
|Zee Horror Show|
|-
|1998–2002
|X Zone|
|}

Mythological series

Reality/non-scriptedAap Bolein Haan To Haan, Aap Bolein Naa To Naa (2001–2002)Aap Ki Adalat (1992)Aji Sunte Ho (2016–2017)Antakshari Intercollegiate Championship (2007)Archana Aaa-Haa (2002–2003)Baazi Kiski (2001)Bournvita Quiz Contest (1992)Chota Packet Bada Dhamaka (2008–2009)Cricket Star (2006–2007)The Chust Drust show (2000)Connected Hum Tum (2013)Dance India Dance (2009–present)Dance India Dance Battle Of The Champions (2019)Dastak (2000)Don (2007)Dream DestinationsEk Se Badhkar Ek – Jalwe Sitaron Ke (2008)Ek Se Badhkar Ek - Chota Packet Bada Dhamaka (2008–2009)Foot Loose (2000)Idea Jalsa (2006)India's Best Cinestars Ki Khoj (2004-2014)I Can Do That (2015)India's Best Judwaa (2017)India's Most Wanted (1999–2005)Idea Zee Cinestars (2006-2007)Jai Shri Swaminarayan (2002)Jeena Isi Ka Naam Hai  (2002-2008)Juzzbaatt - Sangeen Se Namkeen Tak (2019)Kaarvan Kismat Ka (2002)Kam Ya Zyaada (2005)Khana Khazana (1993–2012)Hasne Aur Hasaane Ka Tonic – Ladies Special (2009)Philips Top 10 (1994–1999)Nilamghar... Bid Bid Boom (2001)Razzmatazz (2001)Rock-N-Roll Family (2008)Sa Re Ga Ma Pa (1995–present)Sa Re Ga Ma Pa Challenge 2005 (2005–2006)Sa Re Ga Ma Pa Ek Main Aur Ek Tu (2006)Sa Re Ga Ma Pa L'il Champs (2006)Sa Re Ga Ma Pa Challenge 2009 (2008–2009)Sa Re Ga Ma Pa Challenge USA 2008 (2008)Sa Re Ga Ma Pa Challenge 2007 (2007)Sa Re Ga Ma Pa L'il Champs International (2007–2008)Sa Re Ga Ma Pa L'il Champs 2009 (2009)Sa Re Ga Ma Pa Mega Challenge (2009)Sa Re Ga Ma Pa Singing Superstar (2010)Sa Re Ga Ma Pa L'il Champs 2011 (2011)Sa Re Ga Ma Pa L'il Champs 2017 (2017)Sa Re Ga Ma Pa L'il Champs 2020 (2020)Sa Re Ga Ma Pa 2021 (2021–2022)Sa Re Ga Ma Pa L'il Champs 2022 (2022–2023) Saanp Seedi (1992–1994)Sawaal Dus Crore Ka (2000)Shabaash India (2006–2008)Simply Shekhar (2001)Swarn Swar Bharat (2022)The Tech Show  (1998)Titan Antakshari (1993–2007)Tol Mol Ke Bol (1997)Wheel Ghar Ghar Mein (2009–2010)Yaaron Ki Baraat (2016)Yoga for You (2016–2017)Zaike Ka Safar (2000–2001)

Hindi dubbed showsFigure It OutThe Journey of Allen StrangeKenan & KelLegends of the Hidden TempleNickelodeon GutsAnimated seriesAaahh!!! Real MonstersAladdinAngry BeaversBatman: The Animated SeriesBen 10BonkersCamp LazloCaptain Planet and the PlaneteersCatDogChip 'n Dale: Rescue RangersCodename: Kids Next DoorCourage the Cowardly DogDexter's LaboratoryDonald Duck PresentsDonald's Quack AttackDuckTalesEd, Edd n EddyThe FlintstonesFoster's Home for Imaginary FriendsGood Morning, Mickey!Goof TroopHey Arnold!The JetsonsThe Little MermaidThe Mask: Animated SeriesMickey's Mouse TracksMike, Lu & OgThe New Adventures of Winnie the PoohThe New Scooby and Scrappy-Doo ShowPinky and the BrainThe Powerpuff GirlsThe Real Adventures of Jonny QuestThe Road Runner ShowRobotboyRugratsSamurai JackSheep in the Big CitySuperman: The Animated SeriesThe Sylvester & Tweety MysteriesTaleSpinTimon & PumbaaTom & Jerry KidsTelevision filmsHanste Khelte (1994)Phir Teri Kahani Yaad Aayee (1993)Mr. Shrimati (1994)Mohini (1995)Chura Ke Dil Mera'' (2002)

See also
 List of programmes broadcast by & TV
 List of programmes broadcast by Zee Zindagi

References

Zee TV
 
Zee TV